The 2016 Men's World Floorball Championships were the 11th World Championships in men's floorball. The tournament took place in  Latvia in December 2016.

Qualification

Qualification events were conducted between 2 and 14 February 2016.

Venues

Draw
The teams will be divided into four pots according to the world ranking. (World rankings shown in parentheses).

Results

Preliminary round

Group A

Group B

Group C

Group D

Knock-out stage

Play-off

Quarterfinals

Semifinals

Bronze medal game

Final

Placement matches

13th place bracket

Matches 13th–16th

15th place match

13th place match

9th place bracket

Matches 9th–12th

11th place match

9th place match

5th place bracket

Matches 5th–8th

7th place match

5th place match

Ranking and statistics

Final ranking
The official IFF final ranking of the tournament:

All-star team
Best goalkeeper:  Pascal Meier
Best defenders:  Krister Savonen,  Tatu Väänänen
Best forwards:  Alexander Galante Carlström,  Matěj Jendrišák,  Peter Kotilainen

External links
Tournament webpage

References

2016 Men's
2016 in floorball
International sports competitions hosted by Latvia
2016 in Latvian sport
December 2016 sports events in Europe
Sports competitions in Riga
21st century in Riga